Commerce Place is an office and retail complex in Edmonton, Alberta, Canada.

Commerce Place has a small selection of shops in the main levels of the mall.

It is connected to Manulife Place by pedway.

Commerce Place is home to the Edmonton Consular Post, a satellite of the Italian Consulate in Vancouver.

See also
List of tallest buildings in Edmonton

References

External links
Commerce Place
Commerce Place Emporis profile

Buildings and structures completed in 1990
Postmodern architecture in Canada
Shopping malls in Edmonton
Skyscraper office buildings in Canada
Buildings and structures in Edmonton
Skyscrapers in Edmonton
1990 establishments in Alberta